Aatamin puvussa ja vähän Eevankin is a 1928 novel by Finnish writer and novelist Yrjö Soini under his pen name Agapetus.

Aatamin puvussa ja vähän Eevankin may also refer to:

Aatamin puvussa ja vähän Eevankin (1931 film), directed by Jaakko Korhonen 
Aatamin puvussa ja vähän Eevankin (1940 film), directed by Ossi Elstelä
Aatamin puvussa ja vähän Eevankin (1971 film), directed by Matti Kassila